Morgan Marshall Hunt (5 March 1931 – February 2012) was a Welsh footballer who played as a half-back. He played for Doncaster Rovers and later managed the club's ladies outfit.

Career
Hunt played for Askern Welfare, before joining Peter Doherty's Doncaster Rovers in 1953. The club finished 12th in the Second Division in 1953–54. The Belle Vue outfit finished 18th in 1954–55, 17th in 1955–56, and 14th in 1956–57, before suffering relegation in last place in 1957–58. He spent the 1958–59 campaign at Norwich City, playing seven games as the "Canaries" finished two places and four points off the Third Division promotion places. He joined Norman Low's Port Vale for a four-figure fee in July 1959. Despite the money spent acquiring him, he only played two Third Division games for the club before being released at the end of the season. He later played for Boston United in the Southern League, before returning to old club Askern Welfare as the player-manager. Hunt went on to manage Doncaster Rovers Belles L.F.C. for the 1979–80 season.

Career statistics
Source:

References

1931 births
People from Llantrisant
Sportspeople from Rhondda Cynon Taf
Welsh footballers
Association football midfielders
Askern F.C. players
Doncaster Rovers F.C. players
Norwich City F.C. players
Port Vale F.C. players
Boston United F.C. players
English Football League players
Southern Football League players
Association football player-managers
Welsh football managers
Doncaster Rovers Belles L.F.C. managers
2012 deaths